Bandit Queen or The Bandit Queen may refer to:

People
Phoolan Devi (1963–2001), popularly known as "Bandit Queen", an Indian bandit chief and later politician
Belle Starr (1848–1889), notorious American outlaw

Film
The Bandit Queen (film), a 1950 Western
Bandit Queen, a 1994 film by Shekhar Kapoor on the life of Phoolan Devi

Music
Bandit Queen (band), 1990s indie rock band from Manchester, England

Nicknames
Nicknames in crime